The  Dallas Cowboys season was the franchise's 28th season in the National Football League, they improved the record to 7-8 from 1986, but missing the playoffs for the second consecutive season.

Offseason

NFL Draft

Summary 
The NFL players were unable to reach a contract agreement with the owners, as a result, a strike for the second time in six seasons after the second week of games. Unlike the last strike, the owners replaced the striking players with free agents and veteran players who were willing to cross the picket line. The NFL cancelled all games for the week of September 27 and began playing with the replacement players on October 4. The strike ended on October 15, but the replacement players played the next weekend as well. The replacement players participated in three weeks worth of games overall.

After the Cowboys began the season with a 24–13 loss to St. Louis with an upset over the defending Super Bowl champion New York Giants, the majority of the Cowboys players went on strike. Players that crossed the picket line to play with the replacement players included quarterback Danny White, defensive tackle Randy White, running back Tony Dorsett, and defensive end Ed Jones. Thanks to the veteran players and a few replacement players who would stay on with the team after the strike, the Cowboys fielded one of the better replacement teams. 

The replacement Cowboys easily defeated the New York Jets and Philadelphia Eagles, with the Eagles game being of particular note. The Eagles fielded a team completely made up of replacements, and were no match for the Cowboys, who played several of their veterans throughout the game. Eagles head coach Buddy Ryan was displeased with head coach Tom Landry for doing this and afterwards made it clear that he was looking forward to playing the Cowboys in two weeks when the non-replacement Eagles returned. The following week the Cowboys missed an opportunity to take command in the NFC East when they suffered a devastating loss to the Washington Redskins. Despite playing Danny White and Tony Dorsett the entire game against a Redskins team fielded entirely of replacement players, the Cowboys came up short 13–7.

The striking players returned the following week and on October 25, even though the Philadelphia Eagles were already assured of winning against the Cowboys 30–20, they attempted to go for a touchdown with 35 seconds left in the game.  Eagles head coach Buddy Ryan wasn't happy about the strike game they lost to Dallas, when Randy White and Ed “Too Tall” Jones were still playing at the end of the game.  In the rematch, the Eagles took a kneel down to run down the clock, putting the ball at the Dallas 34 yard line with 10 seconds left.  On the next play, quarterback Randall Cunningham faked taking another kneel down and threw a pass to the end zone that drew a pass-interference penalty, placing the ball on the one-yard line, from where running back Keith Byars scored with 2 seconds left for a final result of 37-20. Dallas came out of the strike with a 3-2 record, but lost 4 straight games in November and December to fall out of playoff contention.

The Cowboys were up and down the rest of the season, following another victory over the Giants with a loss to the woeful Detroit Lions. The Cowboys squandered a 5–4 record down the stretch with a 4-game losing streak, sandwiching heartbreaking losses to the Vikings and Redskins with an embarrassing home loss to the Falcons. After the Falcons game, Cowboys owner Bum Bright questioned coach Landry's play-calling, and Cowboys team president Tex Schramm said of the loss, "this is probably the lowest I've been in my career." The Cowboys rebounded in the last two games, however, defeating the Los Angeles Rams and the St. Louis Cardinals, and eliminating both from the playoffs in the process. Danny White coached the Cowboys for a brief period during the Rams game when there was a threat against Tom Landry's life. Landry returned shortly from the locker room  and coached the rest of the 29–21 Dallas victory.

Running back Herschel Walker had another terrific season, leading the Cowboys in rushing and receiving, and leading the NFL in yards from scrimmage with 1606, while former star running back Tony Dorsett posted career lows in rushing yards with 456. Quarterback Danny White struggled with turnovers throughout the season, and was replaced by Steve Pelleur late in the season. The Cowboys offensive line had trouble with pass protection again, allowing 52 sacks, while the receiving corps was mediocre, with Mike Renfro leading the way with 662 yards on 46 catches. Defensively, the Cowboys really struggled against the pass, finishing 27th in passing yards allowed, despite posting 51 sacks and 23 interceptions. The Cowboys were solid against the run, finishing 6th overall and only allowing 3.5 yards a carry.

NFL replacement players
After the league decided to use replacement players during the strike, besides hiring a new team (referred by the media as "Rhinestone Cowboys"), Dallas forced veterans like Randy White, Ed "Too Tall" Jones, Danny White and Tony Dorsett, to cross the picket line to avoid losing their contract annuities (delayed payments).

This strategy backfired, as there have been several interviews with former players mentioning that this caused a drift inside the team that lasted for years, and that it was one of the main reasons for the franchise's decline during the Eighties decade.

Roster

Schedule
Weeks 4-6 were played with Replacement players

Division opponents are in bold text

Standings

References

Dallas Cowboys seasons
Dallas
Dallas